Clarence Slifer (August 31, 1904 – 1993) was an American special effects artist. He won an Academy Award for Best Special Effects and was nominated for another one in the same category.

Selected filmography
Slifer won an Academy Award for Best Special Effects and was nominated for another one:

Won
 Portrait of Jennie (1948)

Nominated
 The North Star (1943)

References

External links

1904 births
1993 deaths
Special effects people
Best Visual Effects Academy Award winners
Place of birth missing
People from Grundy Center, Iowa